The Espee Range is a subrange of the Swannell Ranges of the Omineca Mountains, located between Pelly Creek and Tucha Creek in northern British Columbia, Canada.

References

Espee Range in the Canadian Mountain Encyclopedia

Swannell Ranges